Game 'N Go (lit. Game and Go)  is a Philippine noontime game show, variety show broadcast by TV5. Originally scheduled to air from Mondays to Saturdays, the program premiered on June 17, 2012, with a Sunday noontime slot., and broadcast live from TV5's Delta Studio in Quezon City, the timeslot is every Sundays at 11:30 am to 2:30 pm. The series ended on February 3, 2013, and it was replaced by Lokomoko U!.

Hosts

Main hosts
 Joey de Leon
 Edu Manzano
 Arnell Ignacio
 Gelli de Belen
 Shalani Soledad-Romulo

Co-hosts
 Daniel Matsunaga
 Monika Sta. Maria
 Jeffrey Espiritu

Featuring
 GAGA Girls
 GNG Dancers
 Nga Nga Girls
 Game 'N Go Gang
 Artista Academy Final 6 Students

Segments
 True or Fall
 Pritong Pares
 Face It
 Tsitsinelasin Kita
 Sing-Galing Go
 Versusan Tayo!
 Game 'N Go-cery

See also
 List of programs aired by TV5 (Philippine TV network)

References

External links
 

Philippine game shows
TV5 (Philippine TV network) original programming
2012 Philippine television series debuts
2013 Philippine television series endings
Philippine variety television shows
Filipino-language television shows